Founded by Sir William Osler in 1912, the History of Medicine Society (formally "section"), at the Royal Society of Medicine (RSM), London, is one of the oldest History of Medicine societies in the world and is one of the four founder committees of the British Society for the History of Medicine.

It covers every medical speciality and with the support from numerous notable physicians and surgeons of the time, including Sir Francis Champneys, Sir Ronald Ross and others, the first meeting on 20 November 1912 had 160 attendees. Subsequently, the society's events became regular and it continues to hold regular events at the RSM in London.

Every year, undergraduate prizes are awarded in memory of the late pathologist Norah Schuster. Eponymous lectures are also held, including the C. E. Wallis lecture every five years.

Origins
Interest in the history of medicine at the RSM can be traced back to 1818, when an exhibition of the Chamberlen family's obstetric instruments took place at the Medical and Chirurgical Society of London. At the request of Dr Joseph Frank Payne, physician who was interested in the history of medicine, the RSM agreed to incorporate one meeting in each session on a historical topic.

Following a failed attempt by Sir D'Arcy Power to form the society in 1900, Osler then succeeded in founding the society by writing 168 personal invitations and planning for "all those who feel that the study of the history of medicine has a value in education". It was considered by Osler to be one of the three most useful things he achieved during his life in England.

It covers every medical speciality and with the support from Sir Francis Champneys, Sir Raymond Crawfurd, Sir Thomas Clifford Allbutt, Sir Ronald Ross, Sir William Selby Church, Sir Henry Morris, Henry Barnes and Professor Richard Caton, the first meeting on 20 November 1912 had 160 attendees.

The society's lectures by Osler, as the first president, covered William Petty's manuscripts and the history of Anaesthesia, and encouraging research and scholarship in topics. Despite opposition from Sir Richard Douglas Powell, Osler personally invited guests to join the new society. When the 50th Jubilee of the Section was celebrated at a special meeting on 21 November 1962 it was noted that "the contribution to the knowledge of medical history made by the Section has been very considerable".

It is one of the oldest history of medicine societies in the world and is also one of the four founder committees of the British Society for the History of Medicine.

The president's medal was initiated by William Hartstorn, who was president between 1973 and 1975. It was made by Kim Southam and donated by Maurice Newbold and officers of the section in 1976.

Prizes

Norah Schuster Prize 

Named after the late clinical pathologist, Norah Schuster, every year, since 1991, three essays in the field of history of medicine or science are chosen to receive this prestigious award. The winners are invited to give a short presentation on their research. This has opened up opportunities for medical students to further their careers.

Eponymous lectures

C. E. Wallis Lecture 
Named after doctor and Dental surgeon, Charles Edward Wallis, this memorial lecture is given every five years and arranged in conjunction of the Odontology section. Wallis was active at the RSM and interested in history and Archaeology. His brother, Mr Ferdinand Wallis donated £100 in 1927 to fund a lecturer, appointed by the society to speak on the history of dentistry.

Bynum Lecture 
Sponsored by Cambridge University Press, the Bynum lecture is named after medical historian Professor W. F. Bynum. This lecture is given annually by a practising social historian.

Honorary Fellows 
2017 Tilli Tansey has been elected Honorary Fellow of the Royal Society of Medicine.

Notable dates 

 1912: First Meeting on 20 November, with Sir William Osler as first president.
 1919: First lady to present a paper to the society, Dorothea Waley Singer.
 1927: First British qualified female dentist, Lilian Lindsay presented "The London Dentist of the 18th Century".
 1932: Meeting in honour of Sir Archibald Garrod
 1950: First female president of History of Medicine Society, Lilian Lindsay.
 1962: Jubilee of History of Medicine Society. Attracting younger colleagues highlighted as an issue.
 1993: GMC issues "Tomorrows Doctors", which promotes studies in the history of medicine. Subsequently, in 1997, the society organised a symposium on "The history of medicine and tomorrows doctors".

Involvements

Dr William Withering's letters 

These were bestowed by Osler in his will.

Sir William Hale-White, president of RSM 1922–1924 was a lecturer in Medicine who, following retirement, studied the history of medicine and wrote on René Laennec and John Keats. He is best known for cataloguing William Withering's letters. A facsimile of Withering's letter was published by Dr Ronald Mann in 1986.

Chalmers Room 
Dr Albert John Chalmers, born in Manchester in 1870, was a physician in tropical medicine in Ghana and Ceylon (now Sri Lanka). He died in India in 1920 and was documented to have an interest in the history of medicine. His wife donated £500 and 350 old books from Chalmer's personal library, including a first printed edition of Celsus, 1478, to the new Chalmer's room on the RSM library's third floor. This room was opened by a ceremony on 23 June 1922. Although the actual room no longer exists, many of its books were displayed in 2016 as part of an exhibition in the RSM library.

Gallery

Origins

See also
 List of presidents of the History of Medicine Society

References

External links 
 History of medicine society
 International Society for the History of Medicine
 British Society for the History of Medicine
 Faculty of the History and Philosophy of Medicine

History organisations based in the United Kingdom
1912 establishments in the United Kingdom
Organisations based in London
History of medicine in the United Kingdom
Royal Society of Medicine
William Osler